Angostura is a town and municipality in Antioquia Department, Colombia. Part of the subregion of Northern Antioquia.

References

Municipalities of Antioquia Department